Two cavalry regiments of the British Army have been numbered the 17th Regiment of Light Dragoons:

17th Regiment of Light Dragoons (1759), (1759-1763)
17th Regiment of Light Dragoons (17th Lancers), raised as 18th Dragoons in 1759 and redesignated as a lancer regiment in 1861.

See also
 17th Regiment (disambiguation)